Denticnemis is a genus of white-legged damselfly in the family Platycnemididae. There is one described species in Denticnemis, D. bicolor.

References

Further reading

 

Platycnemididae
Articles created by Qbugbot
Monotypic Odonata genera